Motueka is a town in the South Island of New Zealand, close to the mouth of the Motueka River on the western shore of Tasman Bay / Te Tai-o-Aorere.

The surrounding district has a number of apple, pear and kiwifruit orchards, as well as growing a variety of specialised crops such as hops. The area formerly served  as the main centre of tobacco growing in New Zealand until the early 1980s. A number of small vineyards have also been developed.

Nearby beaches (such as Kaiteriteri and Mārahau) are very popular with holidaymakers, and the area around Motueka has one of the country's highest annual sunshine-hour indices. Riwaka lies 4.8 km north of Motueka via State Highway 60 and Nelson is 41.7 km to the east of Motueka via State Highway 60 and State Highway 6.

Motueka, as one of the nearest towns to the Abel Tasman and Kahurangi National Parks, has become the base of many tourism ventures, as well as in Nelson Lakes National Park, and in other recreational areas. Extensive limestone cave systems (including Harwoods Hole in the Tākaka Hill area north of Motueka) attract cavers and rock climbers. Sea kayaking, tramping and canyoning now attract many thousands of visitors each year.

Many artists live in the area around Motueka, especially potters and reggae musicians. The Riverside Community, in nearby Lower Moutere, is a pacifist intentional community. Founded in the 1940s, it is New Zealand's oldest cooperative living community.

Name 

The name Motueka, or more correctly Motuweka, comes from the  Māori language, and means weka island, the weka being a bird of the rail family. The town is colloquially called "Mot" by some residents.

History

The first known European visitor to the coast near Motueka in 1827 was French explorer Jules Dumont d'Urville, of the French corvette Astrolabe. He explored and described much of the Tasman Bay / Te Tai-o-Aorere shore line. Three ships carrying the New Zealand Company's Nelson expedition, led by Captain Arthur Wakefield, anchored at Astrolabe Roads, north of Kaiteriteri Beach—about  due north of Motueka—in October 1841. Kaiteriteri was selected as a site for the first settlement but was later abandoned in favour of Nelson Haven. 

The exceptional fertility of the soil and the suitability of the surrounding land for small farm settlement were the main reasons for the establishment of the second town of the Nelson settlement at Motueka in 1842. There was trade between Nelson and Motueka in vegetables and timber in the 1840s. In 1850, Motueka had  "a church, various tradespeople, a general store, a doctor, a clergyman, a magistrate and a constable". Motueka was described as "the village was laid out in small sections in the middle of a splendid bush, and had some good open land all around on which the farms were situated”  in the 1850s. A significant flood hit Motueka in 1877 with the majority of buildings in the High Street being flooded.

During the period, 1853 to 1876, Motueka was administrated as part of the Nelson Province.

Motueka was created as a borough in 1900 with the first meeting of the Motueka Borough Council being held on 17 January 1900.The population at that time was  900 people with 182 ratepayers and 183 dwellings. The post office building was opened in 1902 by Sir Joseph Ward.

The Motueka war memorial was unveiled in 1922. It commemorates the 32 soldiers who died in WWI from the Motueka district. A plaque on the war memorial  was unveiled in 1957 to commemorate the 35 soldiers who died in WWII from the Motueka district.

Geography and climate
Motueka is situated on the small Motueka Plain near the Motueka River which enters Tasman Bay about 4 km north of the town. To the west of the valley the land rises steeply to the Arthur and Pikiruna Ranges, and to the south the flat is broken by the gently rolling Moutere Hills.

The source of the Pearse River near Motueka is the deepest known cold-water cave in the world.

Motueka has an oceanic climate (Cfb) with cool, wet winters and warm, drier summers.

Demographics
The population of Motueka in 1951 was 2464 people which increased to 2824 people in 1956 and 3310 people in 1961.

Motueka had a population of 8,007 at the 2018 New Zealand census, an increase of 897 people (12.6%) since the 2013 census, and an increase of 1,383 people (20.9%) since the 2006 census. There were 2,976 households. There were 3,885 males and 4,128 females, giving a sex ratio of 0.94 males per female, with 1,323 people (16.5%) aged under 15 years, 1,314 (16.4%) aged 15 to 29, 3,189 (39.8%) aged 30 to 64, and 2,181 (27.2%) aged 65 or older.

Ethnicities were 85.8% European/Pākehā, 14.6% Māori, 2.5% Pacific peoples, 5.7% Asian, and 2.3% other ethnicities (totals add to more than 100% since people could identify with multiple ethnicities).

The proportion of people born overseas was 18.3%, compared with 27.1% nationally.

Although some people objected to giving their religion, 53.8% had no religion, 33.3% were Christian, 0.5% were Hindu, 0.1% were Muslim, 1.7% were Buddhist and 3.0% had other religions.

Of those at least 15 years old, 786 (11.8%) people had a bachelor or higher degree, and 1,659 (24.8%) people had no formal qualifications. The employment status of those at least 15 was that 2,835 (42.4%) people were employed full-time, 1,008 (15.1%) were part-time, and 174 (2.6%) were unemployed.

Churches and religion

St Thomas's Anglican church 

St Thomas's Anglican church, located at 101 High street, was listed as a category two historic place in 1982. It was built in 1911.

Former Catholic church 

The former Catholic church, located at 31 High street, was listed as a category two historic place in 1982. St Peters Chanel church was consecrated in 1917 and was built out of marble from Takaka. In 1985, the church was replaced by a larger church for the congregation.

St Andrew's church 

St Andrew's church, located at 64 High street, was listed as a category two historic place in 1982.

Plymouth Brethren
Motueka once served as a centre for the Plymouth Brethren: their New Zealand patriarch James George Deck (1807–1884) died in Motueka and lies buried in Motueka cemetery.

Amenities

Motueka district museum 
The Motueka district museum is located in the former Motueka district high school buildings (built 1913) at 140 High Street. The museum includes exhibitions on local history.

Library 
The Motueka library is located at 32 Wallace Street. It was rebuilt in 2022 and cost just over $4.92 million. It is over twice the size of the previous library on Pah St.

Saltwater pool 
Motueka is home to a saltwater pool which is located on the Motueka foreshore. It was originally built after a sighting of a shark in the 1920s. Originally a wire cage, in 1938, it was rebuilt as a pool and then upgraded in 1950 and 1992.

Golf course 
The Mouteka golf club was awarded the Holden New Zealand golf club of the year in 2018. It is located on Harbour Road in Motueka.

Motueka recreation centre 
The Motueka recreation centre includes a stadium, climbing wall, a fitness lounge, a theatre facility, games room, a skating rink and netball courts. It is operated by Sport Tasman and is located at 40 Old Wharf Road. The climbing wall was refurbished in 2016.

Economy 

Horticulture is the main industry in the area surrounding Motueka, and the town benefits directly from this. Some of the main crops are apples, beer hops and kiwifruit. Sheep and cattle farming also  contribute to the local economy.

Due to the seasonal growth of many crops, the town's population increases greatly with seasonal workers, especially during late summer and early autumn for the apple 'pick'.

At the height of tobacco production, Motueka was home to two tobacco factories. One owned by Australian company WD & HO Wills Holdings and the other by Rothmans International. The tobacco industry has ceased to exist in the area in the early 1980s, when the New Zealand government removed the requirement for some New Zealand grown tobacco to be included in locally produced cigarettes.

Major employers in Motueka include:

 Motueka Lumber Company now known and recognised globally as the MLC Group. Operates a timber processing facility  that specialises in cut-to-length componentry, small end section and specialised timber mouldings.
 Nelson Aviation College trains pilots for the aviation industry.
 Prolam has manufacturing facilities in Lower Moutere and Riwaka (previously Prime Pine) that produce glulam beams, i beams, LVL timber, posts, wood flooring, timber retaining walls and mid floors.
 Talley's Group was established in 1936 by Ivan Peter Talijancich. One of the town's largest employers, the company's Port Motueka site incorporates the Group Head Office, the Seafood Division and the Dairy Division. The Vegetable Division began operations in 1978 at Motueka, but has since been relocated to Blenheim and Ashburton. Seafood processing contributed $46.5 million (10.9%) to the local economy in 2021.
 CJ Industries is a construction and landscaping company.

New Zealand Energy Limited is a Motueka-based company that operates small hydroelectric power stations in Haast, Fox, Ōpunake and Raetihi.

Government

Local
From 1853 to 1876, Motueka was administered as part of the Nelson Province.

The Motueka Borough Council was formed in 1900 and existed until 1989, when local government reforms saw it merged into the Tasman District Council. Today the Motueka Ward is represented by three councillors and includes the nearby settlements of Kaiteriteri, Mārahau, Ngātīmoti and Riwaka.

List of mayors
The Motueka Borough Council was headed by a mayor from 1900 until 1989. The following is an incomplete list of officeholders:

National
The electorate of Motueka and Massacre Bay was created for the 1853 New Zealand general election and was succeeded by the electorate of Motueka in the 1860–1861 general election which lasted until 1890. In 1896 the Motueka electorate was recreated, and lasted until 1946. Today Motueka is part of the West Coast-Tasman electorate.

Education

There are also five other primary schools in the area surrounding Motueka.

Media

Newspaper 
There are two local newspapers in Motueka: The Guardian Motueka, out every Wednesday and The Tasman Leader, out every Thursday. The "Motueka Star" was established in August 1901, and was a six-page newspaper, published twice weekly.

Radio 
The area has a local radio station, Fresh FM, which also broadcasts to Blenheim, Nelson, Tākaka and Tasman.

Transport

Road 

The former , now known as the Motueka Valley Highway, connects State Highway 60 at Motueka to State Highway 6 at Kohatu Junction near Tapawera.

Port 

Airport 
In 1984, Motueka Air started scheduled passenger flights from Motueka to Wellington, New Zealand using a Piper Aztec aircraft. Within a couple of years the Motueka Air network had grown to include Nelson, Wellington and Palmerston North using additional Piper Chieftains. In 1988, Motueka Air was renamed Air Nelson and relocated to Nelson Airport.

Culture and arts

Marae

Te Āwhina Marae is located in Motueka. It is a marae (meeting ground) for Ngāti Rārua, and Te Atiawa o Te Waka-a-Māui, and includes the Turangāpeke wharenui (meeting house).

Festivals

Motueka hosts the Kaiteriteri Carnival and Motueka Festival of Lights.

Sport

Mountain biking 
Motueka sits on the Tasman's Great Taste Trail  which is a mountain bike trail connecting the towns of Nelson, Wakefield, Richmond, Motueka and Kaiteriteri.

Teams 
 Golden Bay-Motueka Rugby Union
 Tasman Rugby Union

Sister cities 
Motueka is twinned with:
  Kiyosato, Hokkaido, Japan

Notable people

Denis Aberhart, cricketer
Michael Bennett, film director, screenwriter
George Black, politician
Tony Blain, cricketer
Ann Boyce, New Zealand pioneer and herbalist.
Edward Chaytor, military commander
Bevan Congdon, cricketer
Josh Coppins, professional motocross racer
Herbert Curtis, politician
James George Deck, evangelist
Shannon Francois, netballer
Owen Franks, Rugby Player, Crusaders, All Black
David Havili, Rugby Player, Crusaders, All Black
Ruth Gilbert, poet
Toni Hodgkinson, middle distance runner
Keith Holyoake, Prime Minister of New Zealand
Denny Hulme, 1967 Formula One world champion
Richmond Hursthouse, politician
Simon Mannering, rugby league player
Roderick McKenzie, politician
Glenn Milnes, cricketer
Walter Moffatt, Mayor of Nelson
Michael Myers, Chief Justice of New Zealand
Charles Parker, politician
Richard Hudson, politician
Alfred Christopher Picard, politician
Bill Rowling, politician
Jerry Skinner, politician
Shelton Woolright, musician, best known as the drummer for Blindspott
Florence Young, missionary

References

External links 

 Motueka Community Board
 Motueka Online
 Motueka Photo Gallery

 
Populated places in the Tasman District
Populated places around Tasman Bay / Te Tai-o-Aorere